Otto Casper "Rube" Peters (March 15, 1885 – February 7, 1965) was a pitcher in Major League Baseball. He played for the Chicago White Sox and Brooklyn Tip-Tops.

References

External links

1885 births
1965 deaths
Major League Baseball pitchers
Chicago White Sox players
Brooklyn Tip-Tops players
Baseball players from Illinois
Dallas Giants players
Jackson Tigers players
Memphis Turtles players
Minneapolis Millers (baseball) players
Jackson Drummers players
Sacramento Sacts players
Providence Grays (minor league) players
New Bedford Whalers (baseball) players